The National Ceremonial Guard (NCG) is an honor guard battalion of the South African National Defence Force serving during ceremonies involving the President of South Africa, Deputy President of South Africa, Minister of Defence and Military Veterans and the Chief of the South African National Defence Force. It is composed of a guard of honour, a drill team, and a military band.

History 
The unit was originally founded in May 1967 as the State Presidents Guard when Charles Robberts Swart was the State President of South Africa. It was dissolved in 1990 ahead of the first democratic elections in 1994. The unit was rebranded in September 1996 as the National Ceremonial Guard. The NCG's old uniform of dark green tunic with black pants was reinstated after it was reestablished. In April 2008, the NCG moved into the Sebokeng Military Complex by order of the president.

Functions 

The NCG takes part official state functions such as the opening of Parliament, and the welcoming ceremonies of visits by international leaders and statesmen to South Africa. It also provides guards of honour at inaugurations of Presidents, state funerals and certain national monuments.

NCG Band 
The NCG Band is the military band unit attached to the NCG. It currently serves as the senior most band of the entire SANDF. Both the NCG and its military band have been sent to different countries to perform in military tattoos and other international events. Since 2001, the band has undertaken the role of training military bandsmen from Namibia and Botswana.

Regalia

Insignia

Head Dress

NCO Rank

Uniforms

See also 
 List of badges of the South African Army
 Bands of the South African National Defence Force

External Links 
 SONA 2013 Behind the Scenes: National Ceremonial Guard and Military Band
 National Ceremonial Guard Band
 National Ceremonial Guard held a full dress rehearsal in CT

References 

1996 establishments in South Africa
Regiments of South Africa
Military units and formations in Pretoria
South African ceremonial units